Plus 2 is a 2010 Malayalam film from the debutant director Shebi Chavakkad. Starring Roshan Basheer, Shafna, Vishnu Mohan, Justine John, Deepak Murali and Sajin, the film tells a simple tale of youngsters doing their pre-university course. It released on 13 August 2010 across theaters in Kerala, to mainly positive reviews.

Shafna who hogged limelight with the recent super hit Katha Parayumpol and its Tamil version Kuselan is moving up from a child actress to the status of a heroine, playing Meenakshi in this movie. Among the five fresh faces Roshan is the son of the actor Kalanthan Basheer while Vishnu Mohan is the son of producer Seven Arts Mohan.

Plot 
The story of Plus Two revolves around five teenagers—Holy Prince, Faizal, Shambhu, Mathews and Ranjit. Prince (Roshan Basheer) is a 12th grade student who stays alone in a villa as his parents are abroad. A girl, Meenakshi (Shafna) with the purpose of looking around for her sister Parvathy, arrives at the wrong address (Prince's house). The death of her mother causes him to sympathize on her and he decides to help her. As time passes, secrets are revealed, and changing situations force them to be more mature than their age demands.

Cast 
 Roshan Basheer as Prince
 Shafna as Meenakshi
 Sajin TP as Renjith
 Vishnu Mohan as Faizal
 Justine John as Shambhu
 Deepak Murali as Mathews
 Salim Kumar as Lalappan/Lalettan
 Suraj Venjarammoodu as "Dinosaur"
 KPAC Lalitha as Valyammachi
 Sai Kumar as Cheriyan
 Manianpilla Raju as Avarachan
 Geetha Vijayan as Alice
 Sona Nair as Mollykutty
 Kochupreman as the security
 Shobha Mohan as Saraswathi Amma
 Resmi Boban as Parvathy

Reception
The film received mixed to positive critical reviews. Veeyen of Nowrunning.com rated the film  and stated, "Shebi proves beyond doubt that his is a talent to reckon with, if you go by his first film. Like the popular ad goes, every one says 'cinema for the new generation; here is a man who has actually delivered 'cinema for the next generation'." Sify's critic rated the film  and stated, "There are certain films which narrate some rather unconvincing stories, but told in a neat way at the same time. Director Sheby's Plus Two is one such film. Yes, you can easily find flaws with the way it has been told and also with the script, but there are certain things about it that you would like as well." The critic concluded his review saying, "Plus Two has its moments and is perhaps more enjoyable than some of the much hyped films that has come to the theatres during recent times." Paresh C. Palicha of Rediff.com rated the film  and also wrote a positive review concluding that "there is hardly any reason to complain as Plus Two keeps us entertained."

Soundtrack

References

External links
 

2010s Malayalam-language films
Indian teen romance films
2010s teen romance films